Thyroglobulin type-1 repeat is an evolutionary conserved protein domain.
Thyroglobulin type 1 repeats are thought to be involved in the control of proteolytic degradation. The domain usually contains six conserved cysteines.  These form three disulphide bridges. Cysteines 1 pairs with 2, 3 with 4 and 5 with 6.

Human proteins containing this domain 
CD74;      IGFBP-4;   IGFBP1;    IGFBP2;    IGFBP3;    IGFBP4;    IGFBP5;    IGFBP6;
NID1;      NID2;      SMOC1;     SMOC2;     SPOCK1;    SPOCK2;    SPOCK3;    TACSTD1;
TACSTD2;   TG;

References 
 
 

Protein domains
Single-pass transmembrane proteins